Abdulmumin Zabirov ( born 4 August 2001) is a Tajikistani professional football player who currently plays for FK Khujand.

Career

Club
On 18 February 2020, FK Khujand announced the signing of Zabirov from Regar-TadAZ.

International
Zabirov made his senior team debut on 7 November 2020 against Bahrain.

Career statistics

International

Statistics accurate as of match played 24 May 2021

References

2001 births
Living people
Tajikistani footballers
Tajikistan international footballers
Association football midfielders